Agyneta mediocris is a species of sheet weaver found in Colombia. It was described by Millidge in 1991.

References

mediocris
Arthropods of Colombia
Spiders of South America
Spiders described in 1991